Vladimir Lvov (born 18 February 1955) is a Soviet sports shooter. He competed in the men's 50 metre rifle prone event at the 1988 Summer Olympics.

References

1955 births
Living people
Soviet male sport shooters
Olympic shooters of the Soviet Union
Shooters at the 1988 Summer Olympics
Place of birth missing (living people)